Let It Shine was a British reality television music competition to find young men to star in The Band, a new stage musical featuring the songs of Take That. It aired in January and February 2017 on BBC One.
In 2018, BBC announced that Let It Shine has been cancelled after one series.

The show was presented by Graham Norton and Mel Giedroyc, with Gary Barlow, Dannii Minogue and Martin Kemp serving as judges throughout the series. Amber Riley was the guest judge for the auditions, followed by Lulu for the group round. Ricki Lake was the guest judge for the first live show, Ashley Roberts for the semi-final and Peter Kay for the final.

The show was won by the band Five to Five, who won the part as the band in the new musical The Band, which began touring in September 2017.

Production
The show's title comes from Take That's 2007 single "Shine". Amber Riley, Lulu, Ricki Lake, Ashley Roberts and Peter Kay acted as guest judges of the competition, respectively. Busted, Beverley Knight, Melanie C, Olly Murs and Kaiser Chiefs performed with the contestants split into groups as part of the second round of the competition, which was filmed at Dock10, MediaCityUK in November 2016.

Format
There are three stages to the competition:
 "The Starway" (auditions)
 "The Collaborations" (group stage)
 "The Battle of the Bands" (live shows)

The Starway
The judges each have 5 stars and each contestant is scored out of 20 stars; in order to proceed onto the next round they needed 15 stars.

Episode 1 (7 January)

Episode 2 (14 January)

Episode 3 (21 January)

Episode 4 (28 January)

The Collaborations
After the episode, a clip was made available on BBC iPlayer which revealed the new names of the bands. Group 1 was named Five to Five, Group 2 was named Iron Sun, Group 3 was named Neon Panda, Group 4 was named Drive and Group 5 was named Nightfall.

Episode 5 (4 February)
Guest judge: Lulu
Group performance: "Kidz"/ "Hangin' Tough"/ "When Will I Be Famous?"/ "Sing"

Group 1
 Collaboration with Olly Murs

Group 2
 Collaboration with Beverley Knight

Group 3
 Collaboration with Busted

Group 4
 Collaboration with Kaiser Chiefs

 Originally Callum Howells & Harry Neale were part of Group 4 but decided to withdraw from the competition, they were replaced by reserves Keith Branic & Jordan Charles.

Group 5
 Collaboration with Melanie C

The Battle of the Bands

Live show details

Results summary

Result's colour key
 Artist was part of the Band in bottom two
 Artist was eliminated 
 Artist qualified for the band

Week 1: Quarter final (11 February)
Guest judge: Ricki Lake
Group performance: "This Is How We Do It"/ "Hot in Herre"/ "(Shake, Shake, Shake) Shake Your Booty"/ "Eye of the Tiger"/ "What Makes You Beautiful"/ "Treasure"/ "Hey Ya!"/ "No Diggity"
Guest performance: Jersey Boys ("Sherry"/ "Big Girls Don't Cry"/ "Walk Like a Man"/ "Beggin'"/ "December, 1963 (Oh, What a Night)")

 Mark Angels, Jazzie Mattis, Matt Thorpe, Jonnie Halliwell & Conor McLoughlin were saved by the judges and through to Semi-final. As Drive had 3 of the 5 members saved and Neon Panda only had 2 of the 5 the saved artist would continue as Drive.
 Anthony Sahota, Craig Webb, Jamie Corner, Josh Bailey & Ryan Butterworth were not saved and therefore were eliminated from the competition.

Week 2: Semi-final (18 February)
Guest judge: Ashley Roberts
Group performance: "It Only Takes a Minute"/ "Could It Be Magic"/ "Relight My Fire"/ "Pray"/ "Shine" (with Take That)
Guest performance: Motown: The Musical: ("Do You Love Me"/ "Dancing in the Street")

 Mark Angels, Matt Thorpe, Jonnie Halliwell, Conor McLoughlin & Jazzie Mattis were saved by the judges and through to Final and continue as Drive.
 Alexis Gerred, Clinton Elvis, Harry Brown, Jordan Harvey and Matt Knight were not saved and therefore were eliminated from the competition.

Week 3: Final (25 February)
Guest judge: Peter Kay
Theme: Musical classic & pop number
Guest performance: Michael Ball & Alfie Boe: ("Les Misérables Medley") and Take That with Robbie Williams: ("The Flood")

 Winning group: Five To Five (Yazdan Qafouri, Curtis T Johns, Nick Carsberg, Sario Solomon, AJ Bentley)

Promotion
During an appearance on Alan Carr: Chatty Man in December, Barlow, Minogue and Kemp confirmed the show's launch date as 7 January 2017, the same date as The Voice UK's sixth series' premiere on ITV; and also showed a sneak-peek of one of the auditionees, and revealed the series' format and stages.

Broadcast
Internationally, the series began airing in Australia on BBC UKTV from 22 January 2017.

Ratings
All ratings are sourced from BARB.

References

External links
 
 
 

2017 British television series debuts
2017 British television series endings
BBC high definition shows
BBC reality television shows
British reality television series
Singing talent shows
English-language television shows
Television shows shot at Elstree Film Studios